Phil Defer is a Lucky Luke adventure in French, written and illustrated by Morris. It was the eighth title in the original series and was published by Dupuis in 1956 and in English by Cinebook in 2013 as Phil Wire. The album contains two stories - Lucky Luke contre Phil Defer "the Faucheux" ("Lucky Luke versus Phil Wire 'The Spider'") and Lucky Luke et Pilule ("Lucky Luke and Pill").

Stories

Lucky Luke contre Phil Defer

Synopsis 
In the town of Bottleneck Gulch is the only saloon for miles around, the "Ace of Spades" which belongs to a crook, O'Sullivan, who sells adulterated whiskey. But as it is the only bar in the area, "Ace of Spades" does good business thanks to thirsty cowboys passing by. But one day, a certain O'Hara opens his own "Ace of Hearts" saloon. Failing to take over his rival and being on the verge of bankruptcy, O'Sullivan decides to hire a professional hitman, Phil Wire, to rid him of O'Hara, dead or alive. Lucky Luke, who is a friend of O'Hara, decides to impersonate Phil Wire. With O'Hara, they put on a production to make believe the death of Phil Wire. As O'Sullivan prepares to leave, the real Phil Wire arrives in town. Together, they try by all means to get rid of Luke and O'Hara. But Lucky Luke is watching. Finally, Phil Wire provokes Lucky Luke into a final duel. Lucky Luke wins the duel and shoots Phil Defer on the shoulder which will end his career as a hitman. Because of this injury, Phil can no longer use a weapon. Afterwards, O'Sullivan is chased away. O'Hara takes his rival's saloon and unites it with his to form the "2 Aces Saloon" (spades and hearts), with "the longest bar in the west".

Characters 

 O'Sullivan: Owner of the Ace of Spades saloon. Sells adulterated whiskey to his customers and has no qualms about making money dishonestly. Does not tolerate any competition.
 O'Hara: Owner of the Ace of Hearts saloon which he had built adjoining Ace of Spades. O'Sullivan then declares war on him.
 Phil Wire: Nicknamed "The Spider". Professional shooter and hitman, he was hired by O'Sullivan to close the Ace of Hearts. He will discover in Lucky Luke an adversary to his measure.

Lucky Luke et Pilule

Synopsis 
Lucky Luke tells other cowboys the story of a little man nicknamed Pill (because he regularly consumes pills) and who looked like a weed from big cities and who had, at first sight, nothing of a hero of the West. He arrives in a city infested by criminals and revolver fights, "Smokey Town". After having contributed (involuntarily) to the arrest of a bandit, Pill is named Sheriff. Thereafter, Pill must arrest the whole gang of criminals. Luckily, his clumsiness and myopia (having had lost his glasses at that time) which made him deviate from the target he was aiming at, help Pill to kill all the criminals. The gang leader almost killed him, but the bullet was stopped by the pill box the Sheriff was carrying.

Characters 

 Pill: This insignificant-looking character manages to pacify Smokey Town with incredible luck.
 Lefty: Leader of a gang of mobsters in Smokey Town.

Notes 

 The look of Phil Defer would have been inspired to Morris by the character of Jack Wilson in the film Shane. Played by Jack Palance, his remarkable postures (arched legs, arched back) made him a villain who greatly impressed Morris.
 This album is one of the few Lucky Luke albums that has been censored. At the end of the original serialized publication in Le Moustique, Phil Wire is shot dead by Lucky Luke. This part was censored to make way for a scenario where he was only injured and made permanently unable to use a weapon.
The original version was used as a plot reference in the hommage story Lucky Luke: Wanted (2021), in which Wire's son Brad comes hunting for Luke to avenge his father.
 Phil Wire's name in French is word play on the word 'iron wire' (fil de fer).

External links
Official Website 

Comics by Morris (cartoonist)
Lucky Luke albums
1956 graphic novels
Works originally published in Spirou (magazine)